Sir Edward Nicolls  ( – 5 February 1865) was an Anglo-Irish officer of the Royal Marines. Known as "Fighting Nicolls", he had a distinguished military career. According to his obituary in The Times, he was "in no fewer than 107 actions, in various parts of the world", and had "his left leg broken and his right leg severely injured, was shot through the body and right arm, had received a severe sabre cut in the head, was bayoneted in the chest, and had lost the sight of an eye."

Nicolls was born in Coleraine, Ireland, in a family with a military tradition; his father was surveyor of excise in Coleraine, and his maternal grandfather was a rector. Nicolls spent his life as an intensely devout Ulster Protestant. He had two years of school in Greenwich, but enlisted in the Royal Navy at the age of 11. In 1795, at the age of 16, he received his first commission in the Royal Marines and soon began service with shipborne detachments of marines. During the Napoleonic Wars and associated conflicts in the Caribbean, Mediterranean, and North Sea, he served as a commander of ships' detachments, and gained his reputation for ferocity and courage.

Connected with his religious beliefs, Nicolls was a committed abolitionist, as well as an advocate for Native Americans and a leader of the Hibernian Temperance Society. During the War of 1812, Nicolls was posted to Spanish Florida as part of the British attempt to recruit local allies in the southern front against the United States. He set up a base at Prospect Bluff, on the Apalachicola River, and had a sturdy fort built there, where he recruited a black and Native American Corps of Colonial Marines. Nicolls' marines and their Creek and Seminole allies fought at Fort Bowyer and were present at the Battle of New Orleans, but the war ended in early 1815 without any attacks on their base. He returned to Britain with a Treaty of Nicolls' Outpost he had negotiated, but failed to receive support from his government for any further aid to his erstwhile native allies.

From 1823 to 1828, he was the Commandant of Ascension Island in the South Atlantic, which was followed by a posting from 1829 to 1835, as Superintendent of Fernando Po, off the coast of Africa, an important base in the British operations against the slave trade. In 1835, Nicolls retired from the Royal Marines with the rank of a lieutenant colonel. For his service, Nicolls was made a Knight Commander of the Order of the Bath in 1855—among other honours—and was promoted to the rank of full general in his retirement.

Early life
Edward Nicolls was born in 1779 in Coleraine, Ireland, the son of Jonathan Nicolls and Anna Cuppage. Jonathan Nicolls (died 1818) was for a time controller of excise for Coleraine. Anna Cuppage (1757?–1845) was a daughter of the Reverend Burke Cuppage, rector of Coleraine, a close kinsman and friend of Edmund Burke. Anna had an older brother William Cuppage (1756–1832), who had an appointment secured for him at the Royal Military Academy, Woolwich by Edmund Burke. William was later a lieutenant general of the Royal Artillery and a neighbour of Edward Nicolls in Woolwich.

Edward was the oldest of six siblings, and some of his brothers had distinguished military careers as well, including Lieutenant Colonel William Burke Nicolls (1780–1844) of the British Army's 2nd West India Regiment, and Commander Jonathan Frederick Nicolls (1782–1845) of the Royal Navy. All five of Edward Nicolls' brothers and both of his sons died in or as the result of public service. Nicolls was educated at a grammar school in Coleraine and for two years at Royal Park Academy near Greenwich prior to entering the Marines on 24 March 1795; this was the extent of his formal education. He was not yet 16 years old when he received his commission as a second lieutenant in His Majesty's Marine Forces, in 1795, and he was promoted to first lieutenant on 27 January 1796.

Career

Napoleonic Wars
It was during his early career, during the Napoleonic Wars, that Nicolls earned his reputation as "Fighting Nicolls", for as an officer on small ships, he was engaged in numerous fierce actions on small boats and at gun batteries. On 5 November 1803, during the blockade of Saint-Domingue, Lieutenant Nicolls took a 12-man cutting-out party in the cutter from HMS Blanche and captured the French cutter Albion from under the battery at Monte Christi. Albion had a crew of 43 men and was armed with two 4-pounder guns and six swivel guns. The British lost two dead, and two wounded including Nicolls. In single combat, the French captain wounded Nicolls severely with a pistol shot before himself being killed. For his courage in this action, Nicolls was awarded with a sword of honour valued at £30 by the committee of Lloyds. In 1804 Nicolls led another boat assault in the capture of a French brig, and led a landing party of Royal Marines in the successful siege of Franco-Dutch forces at Curaçao. Nicolls and his men withstood 28 consecutive days of continuous enemy assaults on their positions.

On 25 July 1805, Nicolls was promoted to the rank of captain, and assigned command of a company which embarked in HMS Standard. During 1807 and 1808, Nicolls participated in the siege of Corfu and in a foray to Egypt. It was during this period, too, that he was honourably mentioned in despatches for his part in the Dardanelles Operation, during which he captured a Turkish flag. In 1808 he led the boat attack from the Standard which captured the Italian gunboat Volpe off Corfu.

In 1808 he made a brief return to England to get married. In 1809, Nicolls commanded HMS Standards marines while the ship participated in the Gunboat War. On 18 May Nicolls' marines assisted marines and seamen under the command of Captain William Selby of HMS Owen Glendower in the capture of the island of Anholt. In the skirmish, a Danish garrison of 170 men put up a sharp but ineffectual resistance that killed one British marine and wounded two before surrendering. Following the capture of Anholt, Nicolls was briefly assigned as the British military governor of the island. On 8 August 1810, Nicolls received the brevet rank of major.

War of 1812

Posting to Florida 
During the War of 1812, Nicolls was posted to Spanish Florida as part of an attempt to recruit the Seminoles as allies against the United States. Throughout the war, the British also recruited black locals to fight on their side, including those enslaved by American owners. As a fervent abolitionist, Nicolls gave particular energy toward this effort. He was to operate from a position established in April 1814 at Prospect Bluff (the "British post"). Sailing from Bermuda in the summer of 1814, the expedition Nicolls commanded stopped in Spanish Havana, where it was told not to land in Florida without prior request by the Captain General, Juan Ruiz de Apodaca. When Nicolls arrived at Prospect Bluff, Florida in August, the Spanish Governor of Pensacola, Don Mateo González Manrique, aware of the threat the Americans posed to Florida, requested the redeployment of British forces to Pensacola.

At Pensacola on 26 August 1814, Nicolls issued an order of the day for the 'First Colonial battalion of the Royal Corps of Marines', and at the same time issued a widely disseminated proclamation to the people of Louisiana, urging them to join forces with the British and Indian allies against the American government. Both proclamations were reproduced in Niles' Register of Baltimore. These were a ruse as to the real strength of the British. The "numerous British and Spanish squadron of ships and vessels of war" he described comprised two sloops and two sixth-rates of the Royal Navy, the "good train of artillery" comprised three cannon and twelve gunners, whilst the "battalion" was a company-strength group of 100 Royal Marines infantry, detached from Major George Lewis's battalion.

The numbers of Colonial Marines and Redstick Creeks are difficult to ascertain, although Nicolls did arrive in Florida with 300 British uniforms and 1000 muskets. Manrique cooperated with Nicolls, allowing him to train and drill Muscogee Creek refugees. Their fighting force having been defeated at the Battle of Horseshoe Bend in March, the few hundred Redstick Creeks still alive arrived en masse at British Post, on the verge of starvation and with no possessions other than the clothes they were wearing. There were so many of them that feeding them was a serious problem: there were deaths from starvation, and a case of cannibalism was recorded. Nicolls still attempted to broaden the forces on the side of the British, and he is mentioned as participating in attempts to recruit Jean Lafitte to the British cause.

Fort Bowyer and New Orleans 
Nicolls participated in an unsuccessful land and naval attack on Fort Bowyer on 15 September. In the fighting, Nicolls was wounded severely three times, and he lost the use of his right eye for life. The taking of Pensacola in November by an American force under Andrew Jackson forced Nicolls to retreat to the Apalachicola River with freed and escaped slaves from Pensacola. There, Nicolls regrouped at Prospect Bluff, and rallied Indians and refugee ex-slaves living free in Florida, recruiting the latter into his detached unit of the Corps of Colonial Marines.

At the start of December, Nicolls was directed to join the expedition against New Orleans. Nicolls joined General Edward Pakenham's force, accompanied by less than 100 Seminole, Creek, and Choctaw warriors. At the Battle of New Orleans on 8 January 1815, Nicolls was attached, with some of his men, to the brigade commanded by Colonel William Thornton of the 85th Regiment of Foot (Bucks Volunteers). Nicolls was the senior-ranking officer of the Royal Marines present at the battle, but Vice Admiral Alexander Cochrane forbade Nicolls to take part in the fighting personally, fearing that mishap to Nicolls might deprive the British of their most competent officer serving with the Creeks and Seminoles. The actual battlefield command of the 100 Royal Marines brigaded with the 85th Foot went to a less senior officer, Major Thomas Benjamin Adair, commanding officer of the Marine detachment on HMS Vengeur. Nicolls embarked HMS Erebus on 12 January at Cat Island Roads, and disembarked at Apalachicola on 25 January, accompanied by several Creek warriors and a number of Royal Marine reinforcements.

End of the war 
The start of 1815 was to have seen a British offensive in the south, with the Royal Marine Battalions to advance westward into Georgia, to be joined by Nicolls and his forces from the Gulf Coast. These plans were overtaken by events, as peace was declared following the conclusion of the Treaty of Ghent. With the offensive cancelled, Nicolls and his men returned to Prospect Bluff. On 15 March 1815, a U.S. Army aide-de-camp named Walter Bourke communicated to Major General Thomas Pinckney that conditions were difficult on the Georgia frontier despite efforts to reinforce American defences, and to negotiate the return of slaves who had joined the Corps of Colonial Marines under the command of Rear Admiral George Cockburn still at Cumberland Island. Cockburn was not inclined to voluntarily hand over British military personnel who risked being returned to slavery by the Americans, and professed difficulty in communicating news of the Treaty of Ghent to Nicolls.

Prior to returning to Great Britain, Nicolls contributed to these post-war diplomatic tensions between the United Kingdom and the United States, by attempting to represent the interests of the Native Americans and blacks who had taken up arms on the British side. On his own initiative, he negotiated and presented a Treaty of Nicolls' Outpost between the United Kingdom and the Creeks and Seminoles, in which a formal alliance would have been created whereby the British would provide diplomatic support for the Indian nations. Nicolls engaged in a heated exchange of letters with U.S. Indian Agent Benjamin Hawkins. Hawkins accused Nicolls of being overzealous and of overstepping his authority in his personal defence of Redstick Creeks, Seminoles, and their maroon Creole allies, whom some Americans in authority viewed as nothing more than runaway slaves, lost or unclaimed property.

Similar tensions existed with the Spanish. Malcolm believed that in cases where former slaves could not be persuaded to return to their owners, the British government would undertake to remunerate the owners.

Return to England 
Nicolls received orders to withdraw his troops from the fort. Nicolls deliberately did not remove any weapons or ordnance from the well-supplied fort, leaving it in the hands of those members of his now-disbanded Corps of Colonial Marines who chose to remain. Those who did not want to stay were evacuated by ship to other British colonies. They were joined by an unknown number of refugee Redstick Creeks who were willing to fight, such fighting being honored in their culture. As Nicolls hoped, the existence of a well-armed Negro Fort (as the U.S. Army soon called it) so close to the U.S. border was an existential threat to American slavery. Nicolls left in mid-May 1815 with the Redstick Creek Francis the Prophet, also known as Josiah Francis and Hillis Hadjo, the Native American spiritual and political leader known for his role in the Battle of Holy Ground, seeking official imprimatur for the treaty Nicolls had negotiated. Francis' son, who wanted an English education, also accompanied him. On 7 June 1815, Nicolls, Woodbine, and Francis arrived at Amelia Island in East Florida, where rumours circulated that the officers were seeking to either obtain British possession of Florida from Spain, or to arm and supply the Florida factions resisting American territorial expansion. In fact, Nicolls had been heading to the Bahamas, and had unintentionally ended up in East Florida. In leaving West Florida, according to the U.S. Indian Agent Hawkins, Nicolls had left local forces with the arms and means to resist advancing American encroachments which were leading up to Andrew Jackson's First Seminole War. Nicolls embarked on the brig HMS Forward on 29 June "for passage to England", and disembarked at Portsmouth on 13 September.

Aftermath 
In England, Nicolls failed to obtain official support for the Creeks, and the Treaty of Nicolls' Outpost was never ratified. While Josiah Francis failed to receive official recognition from the Foreign Office as the representative of "four Indian nations", he did receive recognition as a former Colonel of the British Army in Florida as well as publicized encounters with British notables, before being sent home. Francis returned to West Florida in 1816, continuing to fight for his nation until he and the Seminole leader Nehemathla Micco were captured in April 1818. Andrew Jackson flew a false British flag on his ship to lure them aboard, and summarily executed them in Spanish territorial waters. Nicolls had housed Francis and his son himself and bought them cold-weather clothing out of his own funds, and Francis' son remained with Nicolls to get an English education.

Nicolls was chastised by British government officials for bringing the two Creeks to England, "productive of great Inconvenience and Expence, and entirely unauthorized". The British Secretary of State, Lord Bathhurst, dismissed him as a "wild fellow". However, he was retained on full pay status in the duties of a captain and brevet major of the Royal Marines. While he was in America, he had the local rank of lieutenant colonel (by authority of Vice Admiral Cochrane) as he was commander of a battalion of the Corps of Colonial Marines. He was awarded a pension of £250 annually on 28 December 1815 for a total of 24 serious battle wounds suffered, and awarded a sword of honour by Britain's Patriotic Fund. He was made a brevet lieutenant colonel on 12 August 1819.

In the summer of 1817 Captain George Woodbine, one of Nicolls's former subordinate officers, was present in Spanish East Florida together with the former British soldier and Scottish mercenary lieutenant of Simón Bolívar, Gregor MacGregor. Woodbine and MacGregor both left Spanish East Florida to rejoin the Latin American revolutionary movement prior to U.S. military intervention in East Florida. The names of Nicolls, Woodbine, and MacGregor had become associated with the arming of blacks as soldiers, militiamen, and even as mercenaries. The threat, real or imaginary, was an anathema to North American popular conceptions of the time.

Between July and October 1818, the Niles' Weekly Register of Baltimore published portions of correspondence between Nicolls and the former auxiliary Second Lieutenant Robert Chrystie Armbrister (1797–1818) of the first "battalion" of the Corps of Colonial Marines. Armbrister was one of two British subjects executed in the Arbuthnot and Ambrister incident by order of Major General Andrew Jackson following a drumhead trial at St. Marks in West Florida in April 1818 (the same month and place as the Josiah Francis and Nehemathla Micco summary executions). In the correspondence, assistance was asked of Nicolls to intervene with the British government on behalf of former allies seeking asylum in Spanish West Florida from perceived American wrongdoing and injustice.

Ascension Island
In 1823, Nicolls became the first commandant of remote and uninhabited Ascension Island, a small volcanic island in the South Atlantic, halfway between South America and Africa. In 1815, HMS Zenobia and HMS Peruvian had taken the island to prevent it from being used as a staging post from which to rescue Napoleon Bonaparte from Saint Helena. From 1815 until Nicolls took over, the Royal Navy registered the island as a "small Sloop of 50 or 60 Men", HMS Ascension, since the Navy was forbidden to govern colonies. The island had a garrison of about thirty, with a few families, servants, and liberated Africans. The Royal Navy came to use the island as a victualling station for ships, particularly those of the West Africa Squadron (or Preventative Squadron), which were working to suppress the transatlantic slave trade.

Water was scarce, and an important task for Nicolls was to ensure that the island had a stable source of water. He achieved this by installing systems of pipes and carts to bring water to the settlement from the few springs in the mountains. Food was mostly shipped from England, but some could be procured locally: fish, a few vegetables grown on the island, feral goats and sheep, fishy-tasting eggs from a tern colony on the island, and turtle meat obtained during the laying season from December to May. Due to Nicolls's efforts in directing the harvest of turtles, turtle meat, an expensive delicacy in England, became so common it was fed to prisoners and pigs, and Marines complained of it. This surfeit of turtle irritated Nicolls's superiors and the Lords of the Admiralty, and when an admiral ordered Nicolls to stop feeding turtle to prisoners, he started selling or bartering it to visiting ships. With this monotonous diet, men on the island relied on rum for spice. Nicolls understood this, and gave large rations of grog when his men showed what he called "spirited and Soldierlike feelings".

On the confines of the island feuds were vicious, and one surgeon went insane. Pirates were frequently seen off Ascension, keeping the garrison on edge. Nicolls was also busied by many infrastructure projects on the island, building roads, water tanks, a storehouse, and developing the gardens on Green Mountain. For these efforts, Nicolls had about sixty freed Africans sent to Ascension, and additionally asked for convicts.

Nicolls had many such grand schemes for trade between Britain and its colonies, but these all failed to materialize. These schemes included a plan to grow oaks in the unlikely location of Sierra Leone for Royal Navy ships, a plan to ship Ascension rocks to England, and a plan to ship New Zealand flax to England which he discussed in a letter to Henry Bathurst, 3rd Earl Bathurst. On 3 November 1828 Captain William Bate replaced Nicolls as commandant on Ascension. Nicolls was given the substantive rank of major before leaving, on 8 May 1828.

Fernando Po
In April 1829, Nicolls was appointed Superintendent of Fernando Po (now Bioko), a tropical island immediately off the coast of Africa, which the West Africa Squadron used as a base for operations against the slave trade. Nicolls received the appointment after colonial administrator and anti-slave trade crusader William Fitzwilliam Owen had refused the post, and after merchant John Beecroft was deemed unfit for the post. Owen, however, voiced his dissatisfaction with what he viewed as Nicolls's harsh rule on the island, and Beecroft increased his influence in the area. Nicolls, in turn, attacked Beecroft for his dealings with former slavers. Nicolls's health suffered in Fernando Po and by April 1830 he had left for Ascension. When Nicolls returned to England ill, Beecroft was placed in temporary charge of the island.

Tropical illness took a toll on the Europeans at Fernando Po, where hundreds died during Nicolls's time there. Nineteen of the 34 men in Nicolls's first contingent died soon after their arrival, and only five of the original 47 Royal Marines who accompanied him to Fernando Po in 1829 survived two years of duty on the station. Nicolls, somewhat restored to health, served a second term as Superintendent of Fernando Po during 1832–1833. Despite his differences with Owen, Nicolls was just as determined to disrupt the slave trade, and equally energetic in his attempts to convince the British government to adopt a more aggressive stance. Frustrated in territorial annexation schemes, he invited the West African rulers of Bimbia, Old Calabar, Camaroon, Malimba, and the Bonny to Fernando Po to form an anti-slavery alliance. To Nicolls's disappointment, the British government ordered him to evacuate Fernando Po on 29 August 1832 and put an end to operations there. Unfinished work and efforts to provide for the welfare of liberated and displaced slave populations delayed the end of Nicolls's mandate for several months, and he did not return to England until April 1835.

During his time in control of Fernando Po, Nicolls clashed with the Portuguese authorities on the neighbouring islands of São Tomé and Príncipe regarding his refusal to return the hundreds of escaped slaves who had sought refuge on Fernando Po. In a February 1842 letter to The Times he said he was accused by the Portuguese governor, Senhor Ferreira, some of whose slaves were among the escapees, of deliberately enticing slaves to run away and of encouraging "thieves" and "murderers". This charge he denied, asserting that he had never actively encouraged slaves from nearby islands to make the dangerous crossing to Fernando Po, but that if they chose to do so, it was his duty under British law and "as a Christian man" not to return them to slavery. He considered those slaves who killed in the course of their escapes as legally and morally justified in their action, nor did he regard them as thieves for having seized canoes to escape in. He offered to return any stolen canoes, and wrote that if Ferreira could persuade any of the escapees to return voluntarily to a state of slavery, he would not impede them. He wrote to The Times during the debate which followed the Creole case, in which slaves transported aboard the American vessel Creole had taken control of her and forced the crew to take them to a British-run port.

Later life and family 
Nicolls retired from the Royal Marines, and was given the substantive rank of lieutenant colonel, on 15 May 1835. On 3 November 1840, he received the brevet British Army rank of colonel, postdated to 10 January 1837. He was awarded a good-service pension of £150 per annum on 30 June 1842.

On 9 November 1846, he was promoted to the brevet Army rank of major general, in June 1854, he was advanced to lieutenant general, and just a year later in June 1855 he was promoted to full general.

In July 1855, he was made Knight Commander of the Order of the Bath (KCB).

In 1809, while still a young captain of Marines, Nicolls married Miss Eleanor Bristow (1792–1880), who was also from northern Ireland. They had the following children:
Alicia Sarah Nicolls (1810–1891), married Thomas Ashworth in 1847
Eleanor Hester Nicolls (1811–1898), married Macgregor Laird (1808–1861) in 1837
Edwina Anna Nicolls (1814–1902), married John Hill Williams in 1853
Jane Mary Nicolls (1819–1901), married Royal Navy Captain Archibald Douglas William Fletcher (1821–1882)
Elizabeth Nicolls (1821–1856), married the educator John Richard Blakiston (1829–1917) in 1854
Lieutenant Edward Nicolls (1821–1844) of the Royal Navy, who died attempting to save a man's life while serving as first lieutenant of HMS Dwarf
Major Richard Orpin Townsend Nicolls (1823–1862) of the Madras Staff Corps (British Indian Army)

Nicolls died at his residence in Blackheath, London on 5 February 1865. Eleanor outlived her husband by 15 years, dying on 24 November 1880 at the age of 88.

Legacy
Nicolls has been described by Peter C. Smith in a history of the Royal Marines as "possibly the most distinguished officer the corps ever had." An anonymous detractor during the War of 1812 described Nicolls as an "impatient and blustering Irishman" but "apparently brave". A similar assessment was said to have been made in 1815 by Lord Bathurst, the Secretary of State for War and the Colonies, who called him "a man of activity and spirit, but a very wild fellow." Nicholls Town, in the Bahamas, is named for Nicolls. Its founders were former slaves Nicolls had helped liberate and reach British territory, where they were free.

Footnotes

References

Works cited

1779 births
1865 deaths
Administrators of Ascension Island
19th-century Anglo-Irish people
British abolitionists
British military personnel of the Napoleonic Wars
British military personnel of the War of 1812
Irish abolitionists
Knights Commander of the Order of the Bath
People from Coleraine, County Londonderry
Royal Marines generals
Negro Fort